Stare Bielice  is a village in the administrative district of Gmina Biesiekierz, within Koszalin County, West Pomeranian Voivodeship, in north-western Poland.

For the history of the region, see History of Pomerania.

The village has a population of 1,000.

Notable residents
 Günther Maleuda (1931-2012), German politician

References

Stare Bielice